Sir John Munro, 4th Baronet of Foulis (died ), 22nd Baron and 25th chief of the Clan Munro, was such a strenuous supporter of Presbyterianism, that, being of a large frame, he was known as "the Presbyterian mortar-piece."

Career
In the Stuart persecutions, previous to his succession to the title, he had for his adherence to the covenant, been both fined and imprisoned by the tyrannical government that then ruled Scotland. As John Munro had been fined and imprisoned as a Covenanter, at the Glorious Revolution he naturally took the side of William of Orange.

In 1661, by a deed dated 23 January, John entered into a bond of friendship and manrent with Kenneth Mor Mackenzie, 3rd Earl of Seaforth, chief of MacKenzies. They became bound to each other for themselves and for their friends to live as good neighbours and to assist and defend each other.

John is also mentioned in a minute of agreement between George Sinclair, Earl of Caithness and George Gordon, Lord Strathnaver who later became the 14th Earl of Sutherland, dated 7 December 1668, as one of the Earl of Cathness's and Earl of Argyll's 'Deputies' in the Sheriffship and Justiciary. The other Deputes are Lord Strathnaver himself, Ross of Balnagowan and Sir George Munro of Glenurquhie.

From 1689 to 1695 he represented Ross-shire as a shire commissioner in the Parliament of Scotland, succeeded in the role by his son Robert.

Personal life
John married Agnes, daughter of Sir Kenneth Mackenzie, 3rd Earl of Seaforth chief of the Clan Mackenzie. Together, they had six children:

 Sir Robert Munro, 5th Baronet of Foulis, (the Blind Baron).  John's heir and successor.
 Cpt. Andrew Munro.
 Jane Munro.
 Christian Munro.
 Anne Munro.
 Margaret Munro.

Sir John died in September 1697.

See also

Munro baronets
Clan Munro

External links and references

1697 deaths
Baronets in the Baronetage of Nova Scotia
People from Ross and Cromarty
John Munro, 4th Baronet of Foulis
Year of birth missing
Scottish Presbyterians
Covenanters
18th-century Scottish people
Members of the Parliament of Scotland 1689–1702
Shire Commissioners to the Parliament of Scotland